Mucho (A lot) is the 9th album by Argentine rock group Babasónicos. It was released on CD in 2008. The first single for the album is "Pijamas", and peaked 1 in Argentina. The second single was released in September.

Track listing
"Yo Anuncio" (I Announce)
"Pijamas" (Pajamas)
"Escamas" (Scales)
"Cuello Rojo" (Redneck)
"Cómo Eran Las Cosas" (How Things Were)
"Microdancing"
"Las Demás" (The Others)
"Estoy Rabioso" (I'm Angry)
"Nosotros" (Us)
"El Ídolo" (The Idol)

Singles
"Pijamas" (#1 Argentina)
"Microdancing" (#1 Argentina)
"Las Demás" (#19 Argentina)
"Escamas"
"Nosotros"
"El Ídolo"

Trivia

 Gabriel Manelli -bass player- did help composing the album and recorded some tracks for it, before his untimely death in January. Some of the songs were played and recorded by "Carca" too.
 A B-Sides album with the songs who didn't make the final cut for Mucho, called Mucho + (Much More) was released in 2009. It was released as a Bonus CD in a Re-Release of the album. The track "Formidable" from this cd will be released as single in July 2009.
 The album was released in cellphones before the physical CD release. The cellphone version contains a song called "Todo dicho" (All Said) as track 5, instead of "Cómo eran las cosas" on the CD version.
 The deluxe version of the album contains another unreleased track from the Mucho sessions, "Para lelos" (For morons).
 The song "Microdancing" is featured on the Pro Evolution Soccer 2011 soundtrack.

References

2008 albums
Babasónicos albums